Charles Edward Keyser DL FSA (September 10, 1847 – May 23, 1929) was a British stockbroker and authority on English church architecture. In his later life, he became Lord of the Manor of Aldermaston in the English county of Berkshire.

Biography 

Charles Keyser was born in Paddington, London, to financier Charles Keyser (d. 1892) and Margaret Blore (daughter of Edward Blore). Keyser attended Eton College, before studying Law at Trinity College, Cambridge.  He gained his B. A. in 1870 and his MA in 1873. Keyser joined Colne Valley Water, becoming the chairman. At this time, he lived at Warren House in Stanmore with his sister, Agnes.  Leaving Warren House in approximately 1890, Keyser bought Merry Hill House in Bushey. While living in Hertfordshire, he captained the Hertfordshire County Cricket Club for eight years.
After his studies, Keyser worked in the City of London as a stockbroker, building great wealth.

In 1879, Keyser was appointed as a Fellow of the Society of Antiquaries due to his writings and lectures on English church architecture. In 1883, he wrote for the South Kensington Museum about buildings in Great Britain with mural paintings. He became president of the British Archaeological Association in 1906, a post he held until his death.  In his obituary in the Association's Journal, he was credited with reviving the Association's fortunate and he was an extraordinarily active president, publishing many papers in the Association's Journal.

In 1893, Keyser purchased Aldermaston Court, a neoclassical mansion and estate in the Berkshire village of Aldermaston. The manor house was built in the mid-19th century by Philip Charles Hardwick, a student of Keyser's maternal grandfather. Keyser had been told of the estate's sale by his sister, Agnes, who said that it reminded her of her stay at Sandringham House. He was the benefactor of numerous projects in the village, including the renovation of the church, establishment of a water supply and drainage system, and building of a parish hall. While in Aldermaston, Keyser was involved with the South African Wars, establishing a convalescent home for wounded soldiers.  He later equipped the parish hall for the same purpose if its use was necessary.

Keyser served as a Justice of the Peace in both Hertfordshire and Berkshire, and sat on both county councils. He was, at various times, Deputy Lieutenant and High Sheriff of Berkshire.

Keyser was a freemason and Knight Templar. He was initiated into Isaac Newton University Lodge, later rising to Grand Warden of England and Deputy Provincial Grand Master of Hertfordshire. He was also chairman of the Harrow and Reading divisions of the Conservative Association, and was treasurer of the west Hertfordshire association.

Personal life 
Keyser married Mary Emma Bagnall on 29 November 1871.  They had one son, Charles Norman (1885–1964), and three daughters: Dorothy Margaret (1884–1963), Muriel Agnes (1886–1977) and Sybil Violet (1889–1966).  In the 1891 census, all four Keyser children were listed as living at St George Hanover Square.  In the following census, Keyser's daughters were recorded at 37 Portman Square.

See also 
 Aldermaston Court

References

Sources 

1929 deaths
1847 births
Fellows of the Society of Antiquaries of London
People from Aldermaston
Stockbrokers
19th-century English businesspeople
Freemasons of the United Grand Lodge of England
Deputy Lieutenants of Berkshire
High Sheriffs of Berkshire
British Freemasons
Members of Isaac Newton University Lodge